The Welsh crown jewels (Welsh: Tlysau coron Cymru) refers to the royal relics of the Kingdom of Gwynedd that were stolen by Edward I of England following the death of Llywelyn ap Gruffudd (Llywelyn the Last), Prince of Wales, in Cilmeri.

Death of Llywelyn and appropriation of crown jewels 
 
Llywelyn ap Gruffydd, commonly known as Llywelyn Ein Llyw Olaf (Llywelyn the Last), was the last native Prince of Wales, in an independent Wales. Llywelyn was killed by English soldiers in an ambush trick under the guise of discussions in Cilmeri near Builth Wells in 1282. His head was paraded in London and placed on a Tower of London spike. In 1283, his brother Dafydd ap Gruffydd was dragged through the streets of Shrewsbury by a horse, hanged, revived and disemboweled. His bowels were thrown into a fire as he watched. Finally, his head was cut off and placed on a Tower of London spike next to his brother Llywelyn, and his body cut into quarters.

After the final defeat of 1283, Gwynedd was stripped of all royal insignia, relics, and regalia. Edward took particular delight in appropriating the royal home of the Gwynedd dynasty. In August 1284, he set up his court at Abergwyngregyn, Gwynedd. With equal deliberateness, he removed all the insignia of majesty from Gwynedd; a coronet was solemnly presented to the shrine of St. Edward at Westminster; the matrices of the seals of Llywelyn, of his wife, and of his brother Dafydd were melted down to make a chalice which was given by the king to Vale Royal Abbey where it remained until the dissolution of that institution in 1538, after which it came into the possession of the family of the final abbot. The most precious religious relic in Gwynedd, the fragment of the True Cross known as Cross of Neith, was paraded through London in May 1285 in a solemn procession on foot led by the king, the queen, the archbishop of Canterbury and fourteen bishops, and the magnates of the realm. Edward was thereby appropriating the historical and religious regalia of the house of Gwynedd and placarding to the world the extinction of its dynasty and the annexation of the principality to his Crown. Commenting on this a contemporary chronicler is said to have declared "and then all Wales was cast to the ground."

Llywelyn's coronet 

Llywelyn's coronet (Welsh: Talaith Llywelyn) is a lost treasure of Welsh history. It is recorded that Llywelyn ap Gruffudd, Prince of Wales and Lord of Aberffraw had deposited this crown (Welsh: Talaith) and other items (such as the Cross of Neith) with the monks at Cymer Abbey for safekeeping at the start of his final campaign in 1282. He was killed later that year. It was seized alongside other holy artefacts in 1284 from the ruins of the defeated Kingdom of Gwynedd. Thereafter it was taken to London and presented at the shrine of Edward the Confessor in Westminster Abbey by Alphonso, Earl of Chester, heir to King Edward I of England as a token of the complete annihilation of the independent Welsh state.

Rees Davies believes that there were several coronets and among those seized in 1282 was the "Coron Arthur", an older native Welsh treasure, that may have been forged as far back as the reign of Owain Gwynedd (1137–1171) or perhaps earlier, as the princes of Gwynedd sought to consolidate their position as the primary rulers of Wales.

 He (Edward) appropriated the most valuable and potent symbols of Welsh princely independence – Llywelyn's coronet, the matrix of his seal, the jewels and crown of Arthur, and above all the most cherished relic in Wales, the piece of the true cross known as Y Groes Naid (just as he removed the Stone of Scone from Scotland in 1296).
 R.R. Davies

Cross of Neith 

The Cross of Neith (Welsh Y Groes Naid or Y Groes Nawdd) was a sacred relic believed to be a fragment of the True Cross which had been kept at Aberconwy by the kings and princes of Gwynedd, members of the Aberffraw dynasty who established the Principality of Wales. They believed it afforded them and their people divine protection. It is not known when it first arrived in Gwynedd or how they had inherited it, but it is possible that it was brought back from Rome by king Hywel Dda following his pilgrimage in about 928. According to tradition it was handed down from prince to prince until the time of Llywelyn ap Gruffudd and his brother Dafydd.

Matrices of Llywelyn's seal 
The matrices of the seals of Llywelyn, of his wife, and of his brother Dafydd were melted down to make a chalice which was given by the king to Vale Royal Abbey where it remained until the dissolution of that institution in 1538, after which it came into the possession of the family of the final abbot.

Glyndwr crown 
Mystery surrounds the identity and whereabouts of a possible second Welsh crown, the crown of Owain Glyndŵr. Glyndŵr was crowned in 1404 at the Welsh parliament or Cynulliad held at Machynlleth – but with whose crown? It is possible that this was either another pre-conquest dynastic coronet, similar to Llywelyn's, and potentially the crown of the Kings of Powys known as the Crown of Elisig. Alternatively, it could have been one that was made specifically for the occasion. Another possibility is that Llywelyn's crown, which had been stolen in 1303 alongside the English Crown Jewels, had not been returned with the rest of them, and thus escaped destruction by Cromwell. This fact may have been covered up to avoid further embarrassment. If it is true, then this crown would probably have been "lost" at the fall of Harlech Castle in 1409 or may be still hidden in Glyndŵr's undiscovered final resting place.

See also 

 List of rulers of Wales
 Wales in the Middle Ages
 Archaeology of Wales

References 

History of Wales
Welsh artefacts